Otto Stapf may refer to:

 Otto Stapf (botanist) (1857–1933), Austrian botanist and taxonomist
 Otto Stapf (officer) (1890–1963), German general